Caranus was the son of Philip and a half-brother of Alexander the Great. It used to be thought that his mother was Cleopatra Eurydice and so Caranus was an infant at the time of his death. Cleopatra Eurydice bore Philip a female child, Europa, shortly before his death in October 336 BC. However, since the probable date for Philip and Cleopatra's marriage was spring 337 BC, that would mean that Cleopatra bore two children in 18-20 months. That is possible but unlikely. 

According to Justin, Alexander had killed Caranus soon after his accession in 336 BC because he feared him. Alexander would have been more likely to fear a teenager brother than an infant as a rival for the throne.  It seems probable that Caranus was the son of one of Philip's other wives, either Phila or Philinna. 

Pausanias reports that Olympias was responsible for the deaths of Cleopatra and her son.

See also
Europa of Macedon

References

People executed by Alexander the Great
4th-century BC Macedonians
Executed royalty of Macedonia (ancient kingdom)
Year of birth unknown
336 BC deaths
Executed royalty